Ruth Marshall (born June 7, 1965) is a Canadian actress from Toronto, Ontario. She is known for her role in the hit television series Flashpoint. She graduated with a degree in English from McGill University in Montreal, Quebec and then returned to Toronto to pursue a career in acting.

She has appeared the television series Degrassi: The Next Generation and Doc, for which she earned a Gemini Award nomination in 2003 for Best Performance by an Actress in a Featured Supporting Role in a Dramatic Series.  She played herself in the television movie The Path to 9/11.  She was also in the films Dolores Claiborne and Love and Human Remains and Heartland. Her first screen appearance was in The Myth of the Male Orgasm.

Marshall released her first book, "Walk It Off" in 2017. The book chronicles Marshall's experience after being diagnosed with a non-malignant tumour, and details her journey back to health.

Ruth Marshall lives in Toronto. She and her husband have two sons.

Filmography

Film

Television

Books

References
 

1964 births
Actresses from Toronto
Canadian film actresses
Canadian television actresses
Canadian voice actresses
Living people
McGill University alumni